Acá las tortas ("Tortas Here") is a 1951 Mexican film. It stars Carlos Orellana, Sara García and Meche Barba. It is available on YouTube.

Plot
 an elderly couple that had worked all their life making a modest living out of selling "Tortas",  Everything they had they gave to their three children so they could have a better future.  Thanks to their sacrifice, two of them were able to study abroad and now because of the social status they had accomplished, were too ashamed of their parents and denied knowing them.  The third child, had become an alcoholic and his whereabouts were unknown to his parents.

Cast

 Sara García
 Meche Barba
 Carlos Orellana
 Luis Beristain
 Lupe Inclán
 Queta Lavat
 Fernando Casanova
 Jorge Treviño
 Tony Díaz
 Maruja Grifell
 Pepita Morillo
 Miguel Ángel López
 Conchita Gentil Arcos
 Lupe Carriles
 Chel López

References

External links
 

1951 films
1950s Spanish-language films
Mexican drama films
1951 drama films
Mexican black-and-white films
1950s Mexican films